Winter ( – November 11, 2021) was a bottlenose dolphin at the Clearwater Marine Aquarium in Clearwater, Florida, United States, and was widely known for having a prosthetic tail. Winter was the subject of the  2009 book Winter's Tale, the 2011 film Dolphin Tale, and its 2014 sequel.

Winter was found in the coastal waters of Florida on December 10, 2005. She was caught in a crab trap, which resulted in the loss of her tail. Winter was then taken to the Clearwater Marine Aquarium, where she was housed for nearly 16 years. The loss of her tail caused Winter to swim unnaturally, with her tail moving side to side instead of up and down. As a result, Winter was fitted with a silicone and plastic tail that enabled her to swim normally.

Winter became a highly popular attraction at the aquarium. She lived in her pool with two other dolphins, Hope and P.J., the former of which is the subject of Dolphin Tale 2.

Discovery and treatment

Winter was found in the ropes of a crab trap on December 10, 2005 in Mosquito Lagoon of the coastal waters of Florida. At the time of her rescue, she was estimated to be about two months old.

Winter received her name because she was found in December, traditionally considered a winter month, even though the exact date of her rescue falls within the American definition of autumn. The rope in which Winter was entangled cut off the supply of blood to her tail, necessitating its amputation.

Irish prosthetist Kevin Carroll and a team of experts took a year and a half designing and testing a tail for Winter, eventually settling on a simple silicone and plastic tail in 2007. A gel-like sleeve was used under the tail in order to prevent it from irritating Winter's skin. However, Winter's flukes and caudal peduncle had been severed, making the task much more difficult.

Knowledge gleaned from treating Winter was applied to human amputees, as when Carroll used the same gel sleeve concept to ease painful prosthetic limbs for United States Air Force senior airman Brian Kolfage, who lost both legs and his right hand in a 2004 mortar attack in Iraq.

Public recognition
Winter became the most popular attraction at the Clearwater Marine Aquarium and was viewed as an inspiration to people with disabilities. Brock Mealer (brother of Michigan Wolverines player Eliot Mealer), who was paralyzed in a car accident, met Winter in December 2010. The event attracted significant press coverage. Books and Nintendo games have been published about Winter.

In 2009, Winter's story was told by Craig Hatkoff in a children's book titled Winter’s Tail: How One Little Dolphin Learned to Swim Again. The book was published by Turtle Pond Publications and Scholastic. Hatkoff's short book was adapted into an interactive storybook on the Nintendo DS, under the same title.

A film based on Winter's story, titled Dolphin Tale, was released September 23, 2011. Winter portrayed herself in the film. Several modifications were made to the Clearwater Marine Aquarium to accommodate her, including a new 80,000-gallon pool. The film was shot at the Clearwater Marine Aquarium, and other locations in Pinellas County, Florida.

A sequel, Dolphin Tale 2, was released in theaters on September 12, 2014, and introduced Hope, the dolphin who lived with Winter.

Death

On November 7, 2021, the Clearwater Marine Aquarium announced early tests indicated Winter was showing signs of a gastrointestinal infection. The aquarium announced on November 10, 2021, that Winter's condition was critical. During preparation for an exploratory surgery on November 11, 2021, at approximately 8:00pm local time, Winter died at the age of 16.

See also
 List of individual cetaceans

References

External links 
 
Entries at cmaquarium.org

2005 animal births
2021 animal deaths
Individual dolphins
Clearwater, Florida
Animal amputees
Wildlife rehabilitation
Individual animals in the United States
Deaths from bowel obstruction